The list of shipwrecks in February 1887 includes ships sunk, foundered, grounded, or otherwise lost during February 1887.

1 February

4 February

7 February

9 February

10 February

11 February

14 February

16 February

19 February

20 February

21 February

23 February

25 February

26 February

27 February

28 February

Unknown date

References

1887-02
Maritime incidents in February 1887